Saylorville is a census-designated place (CDP) in Polk County, Iowa, United States. The population was 3,301 at the 2010 census. It is part of the Des Moines–West Des Moines Metropolitan Statistical Area. The Saydel Community School District is located in this area, as is the unincorporated community of Marquisville.

Geography
Saylorville is located at  (41.690339, -93.622598).

History

Saylorville was laid out in 1850. It is named for its founder, John B. Saylor.

Coal mining played an important part in the early history of Saylorville, as outlined in the map below.

Demographics

As of the census of 2010, there were 3,301 people, 1,287 households, and 1,004 families residing in the town. There were 1,331 housing units at an average density of 189.1 per square mile (73/km). The racial makeup of the town was 97.3% White, 0.9% African American, 0.2% Native American, 0.9% Asian, 0.2% from other races, and 0.5% from two or more races. Hispanic or Latino of any race were 1.4% of the population.

There were 1,287 households, out of which 28.8% had children under the age of 18 living with them, 69.5% were married couples living together, 5.6% had a female householder with no husband present, 3.0% had a male householder with no wife present, and 22.0% were non-families. 17.3% of all households were made up of individuals, and 7.9% had someone living alone who was 65 years of age or older. The average household size was 2.56 and the average family size was 2.89.

In the city the population was spread out, with 22.8% under the age of 18, 5.6% from 18 to 24, 21.6% from 25 to 44, 35.1% from 45 to 64, and 14.8% who were 65 years of age or older. The median age was 45 years. The gender makeup of the city was 50.2% male and 49.8% female.

The median income for a household in the CDP was $67,197, and the median income for a family was $72,882. Males had a median income of $41,486 versus $35,833 for females. The per capita income for the CDP was $28,034. None of the families and 2.1% of the population were living below the poverty line, including no under eighteens and 5.1% of those over 64.

Education
School districts serving sections of the CDP include: Saydel Community School District, and Ankeny Community School District.

In Ankeny CSD, Crocker, Prairie Trail, and Southeast elementaries serve sections of Saylorville, as well as Parkview Middle School and Southview Middle School. Ankeny CSD residents are zoned to Ankeny High School.

References

Census-designated places in Polk County, Iowa
Census-designated places in Iowa
Des Moines metropolitan area
1850 establishments in Iowa
Populated places established in 1850